Abalos & Herreros is an architectural firm founded by Inaki Abalos (b. 1956) and Juan Herreros (b. 1958) in Madrid, Spain. The founders were involved in the last throes of La Movida Madrileña and later produced a 1997 monograph called Areas of Impunity. They are known for their playful writing and an interest in industrial methods of building. The office split into two Madrid-based offices in 2008. Immediately Juan Herreros' office won a number of important international open competitions, with the new Munch Museum in Oslo being the most important of them.

Works
Parque Europa, Palencia (1991–98)
Gordillo House, Madrid (1996)
Drawings for the Villa FG, Madrid (1999)
Valdemingomez Waste Treatment Centre, Madrid (2000)
Village Hall, Colmenarejo (2000)
Environmental Education Center and offices, Arico, Tenerife (2001)
Jose Hierro Public Library, Usera (2003)
Design for Coast Park, Barcelona (2004)
Woermann Tower, Las Palmas (2005)
Munch/Stenersen, Bjørvika, Oslo, Norway (2009)

Publications
Tower and Office, From Modernist Theory to Contemporary Practice, MIT Press, 2003.

Exhibitions
Landscapes of the Hyperreal: Ábalos & Herreros selected by SO – IL, Canadian Centre for Architecture, Montreal (2015)

References

External links 

 Finding aid for the Abalos & Herreros fonds at the Canadian Centre for Architecture (digitized items)

Architecture firms of Spain